Dr K. P. Ramalingam is an Indian politician and elected as member of parliament candidate in June, 2010 for Rajya Sabha. He is also a former Member of the Legislative Assembly of Tamil Nadu. He was elected to the Tamil Nadu legislative assembly as an Anna Dravida Munnetra Kazhagam candidate from Rasipuram constituency in 1980 and 1984 elections.

He was also Member of Parliament elected from Tamil Nadu. He was elected to the Lok Sabha from Tiruchengode constituency as a Dravida Munnetra Kazhagam candidate in 1996 election.

References

External links
 Official biographical sketch in Parliament of India website

Living people
1954 births
People from Namakkal district
All India Anna Dravida Munnetra Kazhagam politicians
Dravida Munnetra Kazhagam politicians
Bharatiya Janata Party politicians from Tamil Nadu
Lok Sabha members from Tamil Nadu
Rajya Sabha members from Tamil Nadu
India MPs 1996–1997
Tamil Nadu MLAs 1980–1984
Tamil Nadu MLAs 1985–1989